Buchananiella is a genus of minute pirate bugs in the family Lyctocoridae. There are at least three described species in Buchananiella.

Species
These three species belong to the genus Buchananiella:
 Buchananiella continua (White, 1879) i c g b
 Buchananiella crassicornis Carayon g
 Buchananiella pseudococci g
Data sources: i = ITIS, c = Catalogue of Life, g = GBIF, b = Bugguide.net

References

Further reading

External links

 

Lyctocoridae genera
Articles created by Qbugbot
Lyctocoridae